The Rising Generation is a lost 1928 British silent comedy film directed by Harley Knoles and George Dewhurst and starring Alice Joyce, Jameson Thomas and Robin Irvine. It was based on a play by Laura Leycester. The screenplay concerns a couple who masquerade as servants.

Cast
 Alice Joyce – Mrs Kent
 Jameson Thomas – Major Kent
 Robin Irvine – George Breese
 William Freshman – Robert Kent
 Joan Barry – Peggy Kent
 Betty Nuthall – School Friend
 Gerald Ames – John Parmoor
 Gerald Rawlinson – Augustus
 Pamela Deane – Friend
 Eric Findon – Friend
 Eugenie Prescott – Maid
 Clare Greet – Cook
 Nervo and Knox – Themselves

Preservation status
This film is now lost.

References

External links

1928 comedy films
British black-and-white films
British comedy films
British films based on plays
British silent feature films
1920s English-language films
Films directed by George Dewhurst
Films directed by Harley Knoles
Films shot at Twickenham Film Studios
Lost British films
1928 lost films
Lost comedy films
Silent comedy films